A shed is a simple, single-story, non-residential structure.

Shed, The Shed, or Shedding may also refer to:

As a verb
 Woodshedding, rehearsing repeatedly to perfect a difficult musical passage (may be shortened to 'shed or 'shedding)
Load shedding, used by utilities and building automation systems to prevent overloading available supply systems
Moulting, how an animal routinely casts off an outer part of its body

Arts and entertainment

Music
 Shed (musician) (Rene Pawlowitz), Berlin-based DJ and producer
 Shed (album), an album by Title Fight
 "The Shed", a song by John Williamson from All the Best

Television
 Discovery Shed, a UK TV channel
 Shed Productions, a British television company
 The Shed, a subsidiary structure of the fictional criminal operation Prophet Five in the television series Alias

Places
 The Shed (arts center), a cultural center in New York City
 Shed End, the south stand of the Stamford Bridge football stadium in London
 Koussevitzky Music Shed, also known as "the Shed", a music venue at Tanglewood
 ‘The Shed’, a standing Terrace (stadium) at Kingsholm Stadium, the home ground of Gloucester Rugby

Transport
 British Rail Class 66
 Locomotive shed, a storage shed for locomotives

Other uses
 Shed (deity), an Ancient Egyptian Saviour god
 Shed (physics), a unit of cross-section
 Shed (weaving), the area through which weft yarns are woven
 The Shed at Dulwich, a hoax restaurant that was ranked number one in London on Tripadvisor

See also
 
 
 Shedd Aquarium 
 The Shedd Institute
 Bike shed
 Bloodshed (disambiguation)
 Watershed (disambiguation)